The National Film Award for Best Historical Reconstruction/Compilation Film is one of the National Film Awards presented annually by the Directorate of Film Festivals, the organisation set up by Ministry of Information and Broadcasting, India. It is one of several awards presented for non-feature films.

The award was instituted in 1984, at 32nd National Film Awards and awarded annually for non-feature films produced in the year across the country, in all Indian languages.

Awards 

Award includes 'Rajat Kamal' (Silver Lotus Award) and cash prize. Following are the award winners over the years:

References

External links 
 National Film Awards Archives
 Official Page for Directorate of Film Festivals, India

Historical Reconstruction Compilation Film
Documentary film awards